Parliamentary elections were held in Poland on 19 September 1993. In the Sejm elections, 52.13% of citizens cast their votes, and 95.7% of them were counted as valid. In the Senate elections, 52.1% of citizens cast their votes, and 97.07% were valid. The elections were won by the left-wing parties of the Democratic Left Alliance and the Polish People's Party, who formed a coalition government. The coalition was just 4 seats short of a supermajority.

Opinion polls

Results

Sejm
Because of the introduction of electoral thresholds set at 5% for party lists and 8% for coalitions, 34% of valid votes were wasted.

Senate

Notes

References 

Obwieszczenie Państwowej Komisji Wyborczej z dn. 23 IX 1993 r., Monitor Polski. Nr 50, poz. 470, sprostowanie – M.P. z 1994 r., Nr 2, poz. 8
Obwieszczenie PKW z dn. 23 IX 1993 r., M.P. Nr 50, poz. 471; sprostowanie – M.P. z 1994 r., Nr 2, poz. 8

Poland
Parliamentary elections in Poland
History of Poland (1989–present)
1993 elections in Poland
September 1993 events in Europe